Veinticinco de Mayo is Argentina's national day, and may refer to:

 The day during the May Revolution when the Primera Junta (first autonomous government in Argentina) was instituted
Geographic locations in Argentina
Veinticinco de Mayo Partido, partido in Buenos Aires Province, Argentina
Veinticinco de Mayo, Buenos Aires, city in Buenos Aires Province, Argentina
Veinticinco de Mayo Department, Chaco, Chaco Province, Argentina
Veinticinco de Mayo (Misiones), Misiones Province, Argentina
Veinticinco de Mayo Department, Misiones, Misiones Province, Argentina
Veinticinco de Mayo Department, Río Negro, Río Negro Province, Argentina
Veinticinco de Mayo, La Pampa, La Pampa Province, Argentina
Veinticinco de Mayo, Uruguay, Florida Department, Uruguay
Ships of the Argentine Navy
Veinticinco de Mayo (1810), a brigantine launched in 1810 which served during the Independence War
ARA Veinticinco de Mayo (C-2), a cruiser which served Argentina during World War II
ARA Veinticinco de Mayo (V-2), an aircraft carrier which served Argentina up to 1990

See also 
 ARA Veinticinco de Mayo (disambiguation), a list of the Argentine Navy ships with this name